Alai Payuthey is the soundtrack album, composed by A. R. Rahman, to the 2000 Indian Tamil film of the same name. The soundtrack album consists of nine tracks in original Tamil version of the albums whereas the Telugu version of the album has seven tracks. The soundtrack of Alaipayuthey was unanimously hailed as a Mani Ratnam film soundtrack turning for rhythmic fusion using modern synthesizers. A film, initially planned with film score, the recording of the songs eventually took place.

The soundtrack was well received by the audience and received a number of awards held in the subsequent year. The original soundtrack sold over six lakh cassettes, and A. R. Rahman won the Filmfare Award for Best Music Director in 2000. The film score achieved cult status after the release of the film.

Development
Initially, director Mani Ratnam wanted A. R. Rahman to compose only the film score. However, by the end of filming, nine songs were recorded. The lyrics of the track "Pachchai Nirame" are based on colours. The track is influenced by the instrumental works of Kitaro. The song is based on the raga "Kharaharapriya" and brings out the relaxing effect by using the facets of the musical scales. Cinematographer P. C. Sreeram used different color lenses as per the lyrical lines while filming this track. The song uses reverberating effect throughout its length. However, Rahman used light percussion, gently strummed acoustic guitars and layered the acoustic and synthesized versions of the same instrument. Additionally, the track has sounds of flute, violins and percussions. For Pachchai Nirame, Rahman ensured to use the timbres effectively so that the picturisation of the song matches to the tune. The track was filmed at Taj Mahal, village, lake, forests of Kashmir. The track "Snegithane Snegithane" is an ode by a wife to the husband. The track is based on the Shringaar raag. "Snegithane Snegithane" has a video edit version, with additional opening vocals by Ustaad Rashid Khan. The video edit version was released only as a bonus track on the soundtrack and cassettes of Alaipayuthey (Original version) and not on Sakhi (Telugu dubbed version). However, the video edit version was used in all the three film versions. "Kaadhal Sadugudu" consists guitar riffs, based on the IndiPop and coming of age genre. The song was regarded as 'Beach Song' by Ratnam. The track "September Maadham" is a funky track, loosely based on fast-paced R. D. Burman music. "Yaaro Yarodi" is a rustic number that blends of folk instrument sounds appearing intermittently. The track was used in the 2008 film The Accidental Husband. "Maangalyam" song consists of nuptial mantras interspersed with lyrics of "Endrendrum Punngai". The title track "Alaipayuthey" was originally composed by the Carnatic music composer Oothukkadu Venkata Subbaiyar, who also set it to the raagam 'Kaanada'. Rahman added additional beats to the track. The track "Evano Oruvan" which has an Egyptian base to its composition.

Singer Bombay Jayashri recorded for the film score. Rahman made her sing the raag Sindhu Bhairavi for half an hour whose portions were used in a scene when the lead actress was hospitalized in the film.

Critical response

Original version 
Critic based at The Hindu asserted, "A. R. Rahman's numbers are already a hit – be it "Pachchai Niramae'' zestfully rendered by Hariharan or the melodious "Snegithanae'' or "Yaaro Yaarodi''. Now they come with added flavour in the form of excellently captured visuals and scenic presentations." However, the song "September Madham'' was criticized to obstruct the smooth flow of scenes with music. Methil Renuka of India Today praised the music of the film, calling it 'great'.St. Louis International Film Festival, critic Rich Cline called the music exuberant and colourful. Based on the 5.1 surround DVD release, James Grey stated, "The soundtrack is obviously heavily dubbed, which is not the disk's fault, and while the music doesn't have particular weight it comes across nicely enough. the music surprisingly (to me, anyway) accessible (with one tune going round my head even now)."

Track list

Original version 
All lyrics by Vairamuthu, except track "Alaipayuthey", written by Oothukkadu Venkatasubba Iyer and rap portion of "Endrendrum Punngai" written by Praveen Mani. The order of track listing is according to the music cassette or soundtrack CD. The order of tracks in the listing differs in the digital download websites.

Telugu 
All lyrics by Veturi. The order of track listing is according to the digital download websites.

Album credits 
Credits adapted from A. R. Rahman's official website.

Original 
Backing vocals: Dominique Cerejo, Clinton Cerejo, Srinvas, Febi, Noell James, Kanchana, Ganga, Chandran, Sriram

Personnel 
 Flute: Naveen kumar
 Guitar: Kabuli
 Nadaswaram: Vasu
 Bass guitars: Keith Peters
 Veena: Vishwamohan Bhatt
 Sarangi: Ustaad Sultan Khan

Hindi Version 
Backing vocals: Karthik, Tipu, Chandran, Clinton Cerejo, Raqeeb Aalam, Febi, Feji, Poornima

Personnel
 Flute: Naveen
 Bass guitars: Keith Peters, Viji
 Dilruba: Saroja
 Sarangi: Ustaad Sultan Khan
Additional programming: Pravin Mani (for the tracks "O Humdum Suniyo Re" and "Chori Pe Chori")

Strings conducted by V. J. Srinivasamurthy

Additional sound design: H. Sridhar

Sound Engineers, H. Sridhar, S. Sivakumar

References 

2000 soundtrack albums
A. R. Rahman soundtracks
Tamil film soundtracks